The Story of Civilization (1935–1975), by husband and wife Will and Ariel Durant, is an 11-volume set of books covering both Eastern and Western civilizations for the general reader, with a particular emphasis on European (Western) history. 

The series was written over a span of four decades. 

The first six volumes of The Story of Civilization are credited to Will Durant alone, with Ariel recognized only in the acknowledgements. Beginning with The Age of Reason Begins, Ariel is credited as a co-author. In the preface to the first volume, Durant states his intention to make the series in 5 volumes, although this would not turn out to be the case.

The series won a Pulitzer Prize for General Nonfiction in 1968 with the 10th volume in the series, Rousseau and Revolution.

The volumes were best sellers and sold well for many years. Sets of them were frequently offered by book clubs. An unabridged audiobook production of all eleven volumes was produced by the Books on Tape company and was read by Alexander Adams (also known as Grover Gardner).

Volumes

I. Our Oriental Heritage (1935)
This volume covers Near Eastern history until the fall of the Achaemenid Empire in the 330s BC, and the history of India, China, and Japan up to the 1930s.  

Full title:  The Story of Civilization ~ 1 ~ Our Oriental Heritage ~ Being a History of Civilization in Egypt and the Near East to the Death of Alexander; and in India, China and Japan from the Beginning to Our Own Day; with an Introduction on the Nature and Foundations of Civilization.

Reviews 
James H. Breasted's review was highly negative. W. N. Brown was hardly more impressed.  Henry James Forman, reviewing for The New York Times found the work to be a masterpiece as did the New York Herald Tribune.

II. The Life of Greece (1939)
This volume covers Ancient Greece and the Hellenistic Near East down to the Roman conquest.

Full title:  The Story of Civilization ~ 2 ~ The Life of Greece ~ A History of Greek Government, Industry, Manners, Morals, Religion, Philosophy, Science, Literature and Art from the Earliest Times to the Roman Conquest.

Reviews 
Michael Ginsberg was favorably disposed. As was Edmund C. Richards. Reviews over Time and Boston Evening Transcript were very positive.

III. Caesar and Christ (1944)
The volume covers the history of Rome and of Christianity until the time of Constantine the Great.

Full title:  The Story of Civilization ~ 3 ~ Caesar and Christ ~ This Brilliantly Written History Surveys All Aspects of Roman Life ~ Politics, Economics, Literature, Art, Morals.  It Ends with the Conflict of Pagan and Christian Forces and Raises the Curtain on the Great Struggle between Church and State.

Reviews 
J.W. Swain noted the book was written for a popular audience rather than scholars. And, it was successful at that. A review in Time was positive. John Day published a mixed review. Ralph Bates posted a negative one for The New Republic.

IV. The Age of Faith (1950)
This volume covers the Middle Ages in both Europe and the Near East, from the time of Constantine I to that of Dante Alighieri.

Full title:  The Story of Civilization ~ 4 ~ The Age of Faith ~ A History of Medieval Civilization ~ Christian, Islamic, and Judaic ~ from Constantine to Dante ~ A.D. 325 - 1300.

Reviews 
Sidney R. Packard, professor emeritus of history at Smith College, found the work to be quite good. Norman V. Hope had a similar impression. L.H. Carlson, for the Chicago Tribune, compared it to Jacob Burckhardt's works.

V. The Renaissance (1953)
This volume covers the history of Italy from c.1300 to the mid 16th century, focusing on the Italian Renaissance.

Full title:  The Story of Civilization ~ 5 ~ The Renaissance ~ A History of Civilization in Italy from the Birth of Petrarch to the Death of Titian ~ 1304 to 1576.

Reviews 
Wallace K. Ferguson published a review. Geoffrey Brunn wrote a favorable review for The New York Times.

VI. The Reformation (1957)
This volume covers the history of Europe outside of Italy from around 1300 to 1564, focusing on the Protestant Reformation.

Full title:  The Story of Civilization ~ 6 ~ The Reformation ~ A History of European Civilization from Wyclif to Calvin ~ 1300 - 1564.

Reviews 
Geoffrey Bruun published a positive review for The New York Times. Garrett Mattingly, for The Saturday Review, lambasted the volume but went on to say that Durant was widely-read and a capable storyteller.

VII. The Age of Reason Begins (1961)
This volume covers the history of Europe and the Near East from 1559 to 1648.

Full title:  The Story of Civilization ~ 7 ~ The Age of Reason Begins ~ A History of European Civilization in the Period of Shakespeare, Bacon, Montaigne, Rembrandt, Galileo and Descartes ~ 1558 - 1648.

Reviews 
D. W. Brogan had a highly favorable impression. A review over the Time was positive.

VIII. The Age of Louis XIV (1963)
This volume covers the period of Louis XIV of France in Europe and the Near East.

Full title:  The Story of Civilization ~ 8 ~ The Age of Louis XIV ~ A History of European Civilization in the Peiod of Pascal, Molière, Cromwell, Milton, Petr the Great, Newton and Spinoza: 1648-1715.

Reviews 
J.H. Plumb found the book to be very poor. As did Stanley Mellon.

IX. The Age of Voltaire (1965)
This volume covers the period of the Age of Enlightenment, as exemplified by Voltaire, focusing on the period between 1715 and 1756 in France, Britain, and Germany.

Full title:  The Story of Civilization ~ 9 ~ The Age of Voltaire ~ A History of Civilization in Western Europe from 1715 to 1756, with Special Emphasis on the Conflict between Religion and Philosophy.

Reviews 
Alfred J. Bingham found the volume to be a "thoroughly enjoyable semi-popular history".

X. Rousseau and Revolution (1967)
This volume centers on Jean-Jacques Rousseau and his times. It received the Pulitzer Prize for General Nonfiction in 1968.

Full title:  The Story of Civilization ~ 10 ~ Rousseau and Revolution ~ A History of Civilization in France, England, and Germany from 1756, and in the Remainder of Europe from 1715 to 1789.

Reviews 
Alfred J. Bingham was effusive in his praise.

XI. The Age of Napoleon (1975)
This volume centers on Napoleon I of France and his times.

Full title:  The Story of Civilization ~ 11 ~ The Age of Napoleon ~ A History of European Civilizatin from 1789 to 1815.

Reviews 
John H. Plumb was scathing. Joseph I. Shulim took a similar view. Alfred J. Bingham had a mixed yet favorable opinion. A review over The Saturday Review was very positive.

Development history
Editors on the series included M. Lincoln ("Max") Schuster and Michael Korda.

Reception
One volume, Rousseau and Revolution, won the Pulitzer Prize for General Non-Fiction in 1968. All eleven volumes were Book-of-the-Month Club selections and best-sellers with total sales of more than two million copies in nine languages.

See also
 A Study of History
 The Cartoon History of the Universe
 Civilisation (TV series)
 The Outline of History
 The Rise of the West: A History of the Human Community
 The Story of Philosophy
 The Lessons of History

References

External links

  
 

Universal history books
Books by Will Durant
20th-century history books
Series of history books
Pulitzer Prize for General Non-Fiction-winning works
Simon & Schuster books
Book series introduced in 1935
Books about civilizations